Božena Laglerová (December 11, 1888 - October 8, 1941) was a pioneer aviator.

Biography
She was born in Prague on December 11, 1888. In Germany, she used the name "Lagler". She was Hans Grade's first female student in Bork, Germany where she trained in 1911. In July of that year, she crashed and went to Prague to recover. She became the first woman licensed by the Austrian Aero Club, as license #37 on October 10, 1911. On October 19, 1911, she became the second woman licensed by Germany, as license #125. She died on October 8, 1941 in Prague.

References

1888 births
1941 deaths
Aviators from the Austro-Hungarian Empire
Aviation pioneers
Women aviators
People from Prague
Austro-Hungarian expatriates in Germany